Joseph Maxwell Dempsie (born 22 June 1987) is an English actor, best known for his roles as Chris Miles in the E4 teen comedy-drama Skins (2007–2008) and Gendry Baratheon in Game of Thrones (2011–2013; 2017–2019).

Dempsie's earlier acting credits include the medical dramas Peak Practice (2000), Doctors (20012003), and Sweet Medicine (2003), as well as the films One for the Road and Heartlands (2003). He also appeared in This is England '86 (2010) and This is England '90 (2015), Born and Bred, a BBC documentary-drama about Tony Martin, and as the villainous John in The Fades (2011).

Early life
Joseph Maxwell Dempsie was born in Liverpool on 22 June 1987. His Scottish father was a social worker. He grew up in West Bridgford, Nottinghamshire. He received his acting training from the Central Junior Television Workshop in Nottingham, and was also educated at The West Bridgford School.

Career
Dempsie has been the voice of the Clearasil advertisements in the UK. In episode 6 of the fourth series of Doctor Who, "The Doctor's Daughter", that aired on 10 May 2008, Dempsie played the character Cline, a soldier who watches his comrades die. On 18 April 2008, Dempsie appeared on Friday Night Project with Geri Halliwell. On 20 July 2008, he appeared at T4 on the Beach in Weston Super Mare alongside fellow Skins cast members. He appeared as Duncan McKenzie in 2009's The Damned United alongside Michael Sheen, Jim Broadbent, Stephen Graham and Timothy Spall. In November 2008, he appeared in The Moment of Truth, episode 10 of the BBC show Merlin. He plays Will, who is an old friend of Merlin's, from the village in which they grew up together.

In 2010, he voiced Steven, a gay teenager from Nottinghamshire in the Radio 4 play Once Upon a Time. He plays the character of Gendry in HBO's series Game of Thrones based on George R. R. Martin's A Song of Ice and Fire novels. He appeared in the first three, seventh and eighth of its eight seasons. He also appeared in the Channel 4 mini-series This Is England '86, as well as the follow-ups This Is England '88 and This Is England '90. He has also appeared in Harry & Paul on BBC Two, appearing as a northerner who was presented as a gift from the character Harry was playing to his daughter. Recently he has appeared in the BBC Three series The Fades (episodes 3 to 6), as John.

In January 2021, it was announced that Dempsie was cast as Nick in the upcoming Netflix thriller series Pieces of Her, which is adapted from the Karin Slaughter novel of the same name.

Personal life
Dempsie resides in London. He is a Nottingham Forest F.C. fan, and once appeared on Soccer AM wearing the team's shirt. Being half Scottish, he is also a fan of the Scotland national football team.

Filmography

Television

Film

Radio

Voiceover work

References

External links

 

1987 births
Living people
21st-century English male actors
English male film actors
English male television actors
Male actors from Liverpool
People from West Bridgford
People educated at West Bridgford School
English people of Scottish descent